Dar Si Jati Hai Silais a Pakistani drama serial, which started airing on Hum TV on 8 November 2017 replacing Yaqeen Ka Safar. The drama is directed by Kashif Nisar and written by Bee Gul.

It stars Noor Ul Hassan and Kinza Malik on third on-screen appearance together on TV after Sammi and Alif Allah Aur Insaan.

It was aired on Hum Pashto 1 in Pashto under the title صلہ یریکی غوندی and on PTV Home. On national television, it aired from 1 June 2020 to 25 August 2020 and aired twice a week.

Cast 
 Yumna Zaidi as Sila
 Noman Ijaz as Jawad (Joyee)
 Saman Ansari as Sadia
 Sakina Samo as Aapa
 Kiran Haq as Nadia; Joyee's wife
 Saleem Sheikh as Sikander; Sila's father
 Aamna Malick as Zaynee; Sila's cousin
 Osama Tahir as Raheel; Sila's love interest
 Sheikh Mubashir as Hatim
 Noor Ul Hassan as Saleem
 Munazzah Arif as Nausheen
 Kinza Malik as Tullo
 Humayun Gul as Aapa's husband

Theme 
The drama is based on real-life situations that how the girls like Sila are victimized by the people like Joyee and are kept quiet.

Episodes

Reception

Critical reception 
While reviewing the series, Buraq Shabbir of The News praised the performances of the actors and the sensitive handling of the subject.

Awards and nominations

References

External links 
 Official Website
 MD Productions
 

Pakistani drama television series
2017 Pakistani television series debuts
2018 Pakistani television series endings
Urdu-language television shows
Hum TV original programming
Hum TV
Television series set in Punjab, Pakistan
Television shows set in Lahore